Povilas Vasiliauskas (born 29 January 1953) is a Lithuanian politician, the president of Klaipeda Association of Industrialists, former mayor of Klaipėda.

Povilas is a member of the Klaipėda Rotary service club and of the Klaipeda Chamber of Commerce, Industry and Crafts.

References
 Kandidato į savivaldybės tarybos narius anketa - Povilas Vasiliauskas. Candidate declaration. Election Commission of the Republic of Lithuania.
 Klaipėdos miesto tarybai - 15 metų. Klaipeda.diena.lt.

Mayors of places in Lithuania
Politicians from Klaipėda
1953 births
Living people